The Unregistered Baptist Fellowship (UBF) is an organization of churches opposed to registering as 501(c)(3) corporations for IRS tax exempt status. It was organized under this name in 1994, having formed out of the American Coalition of Unregistered Churches (ACUC) organization, founded by Greg Dixon in 1984.

The movement was organized and run by Greg J. Dixon, Sr. who was the former pastor of Indianapolis Baptist Temple, a church that was the center of a 92-day standoff with federal agents over unpaid taxes.

The UBF considers 501(c)3 status an acknowledgement of government authority over the church, and thus they reject registering to make donations tax deductible. The UBF holds that governmental authority stops "at the threshold of the church", and that accepting 501(c)3 status is "caving in to secular demands that interfere with religion."

At one point, UBF held an annual meeting in October. These originally occurred at Indianapolis Baptist Temple, but following the IBT standoff, these began occurring at other churches. It is unclear if they continue to have an annual meeting following the death of Greg Dixon.

UBF does not current maintain a list of "member" churches on their web site.  However, a resolution from their 2015 annual meeting supported Kent Hovind in his trial for tax evasion.

References

External links 
Official website

Independent Baptist denominations in the United States